The 2021 KNSB Dutch Allround Championships in speed skating were held in Heerenveen at the Thialf ice skating rink from 21 to 22 November 2021. The tournament was part of the 2020–2021 speed skating season. Patrick Roest and Antoinette de Jong won the allround titles.
The allround championships were held a week before the Dutch Sprint Championships.
 
The titleholders were Jan Blokhuijsen and Antoinette de Jong

Schedule

Medalists

Allround

Distance podia

Classification

Men's allround

 * = Fall

Source:

Women's allround

Source:

References

KNSB Dutch Allround Championships
KNSB Dutch Allround Championships
2021 Allround
KNSB Dutch Allround Championships, 2021
KNSB Dutch Allround
2020s in Amsterdam